Alan Shaw Taylor (born June 17, 1955) is an American historian and scholar who is the Thomas Jefferson Memorial Foundation Professor of History at the University of Virginia. A specialist in the early history of the United States, Taylor has written extensively about the colonial history of the United States, the American Revolution and the early American Republic. Taylor has received two Pulitzer Prizes and the Bancroft Prize, and was also a finalist for the National Book Award for non-fiction. In 2020 he was elected to the American Philosophical Society.

Education
Taylor was born in Portland, Maine, the son of Ruel Taylor, Jr. and author Virginia C. Taylor. He graduated from Colby College, in Waterville, Maine, in 1977, and earned his PhD from Brandeis University in 1986.

Career
Before coming to University of Virginia, Taylor taught previously at the University of California, Davis and Boston University.

Taylor is best known for his contributions to microhistory, exemplified in his William Cooper's Town: Power and Persuasion on the Frontier of the Early American Republic (1996).   Using court records, land records, letters and diaries, Taylor reconstructed the background of founder William Cooper from Burlington, New Jersey, and the economic, political and social history related to the land speculation, founding and settlement of Cooperstown, New York, after the American Revolutionary War.

Taylor is among a generation of historians committed to the revival of narrative history, incorporating many historical methods (political, social, cultural, and environmental, among others) to understand humans' experiences of the past.

Taylor's The Divided Ground: Indians, Settlers, and the Northern Borderland of the American Revolution (2006) explored the history of the borders between Canada and the United States in the aftermath of the American Revolution, as well as Iroquois attempts to keep control of some lands. His book The Civil War of 1812: American Citizens, British Subjects, Irish Rebels, & Indian Allies (2010) also addressed this borderland area and strategies pursued by various groups. The War of 1812 has also been characterized as a continuation of the Revolutionary War.

In the list of multiple Pulitzer Prize winners, Taylor is one of five authors to have twice been awarded the Pulitzer Prize for History.

Contributing to the anthology Our American Story (2019), Taylor addressed the possibility of a shared American narrative and offered a skeptical approach, arguing, "There is no single unifying narrative linking past and present in America. Instead, we have enduring divisions in a nation even larger and more diverse than that of 1787. The best we can do today is to cope with our differences by seeking compromises, just as the Founders had to do, painfully and incompletely in the early Republic."

Awards
 1996 Bancroft Prize for William Cooper's Town: Power and Persuasion on the Frontier of the Early American Republic
 1996 Beveridge Award for William Cooper's Town: Power and Persuasion on the Frontier of the Early American Republic
 1996 Pulitzer Prize for William Cooper's Town: Power and Persuasion on the Frontier of the Early American Republic
 2007 Cox Book Prize for The Divided Ground: Indians, Settlers, and the Northern Borderland of the American Revolution
 2013 National Book Award for Nonfiction finalist for The Internal Enemy: Slavery and War in Virginia, 1772-1832
 2014 Pulitzer Prize for The Internal Enemy: Slavery and War in Virginia: 1772-1832
 2014 Merle Curti Award for The Internal Enemy: Slavery and War in Virginia: 1772-1832
 2014 George Washington Book Prize finalist for The Internal Enemy: Slavery and War in Virginia: 1772-1832
 2017 George Washington Book Prize finalist for American Revolutions: A Continental History, 1750-1804
 2021 New-York Historical Society book prizes, Barbara and David Zalaznick Book Prize in American History, for American Republics: A Continental History of the United States, 1783-1850

Works

Books as author
 Liberty Men and Great Proprietors: The Revolutionary Settlement on the Maine Frontier 1760-1820,  Chapel Hill: University of North Carolina Press, 1990.  
 William Cooper's Town: Power and Persuasion on the Frontier of the Early American Republic, New York: Alfred A. Knopf, 1995.   
 American Colonies: The Settling of North America, New York: Viking/Penguin, 2001.   
 Writing Early American History, Philadelphia: University of Pennsylvania Press, 2005.  
 The Divided Ground: Indians, Settlers, and the Northern Borderland of the American Revolution, New York: Alfred A. Knopf, 2006.  
 The Civil War of 1812: American Citizens, British Subjects, Irish Rebels, & Indian Allies, New York: Alfred A. Knopf, 2010.  
 Colonial America: A Very Short Introduction, Oxford University Press, USA: 2012.  
 The Internal Enemy: Slavery and War in Virginia, 1772-1832, New York: W. W. Norton & Company, 2013.  
 American Revolutions: A Continental History, 1750-1804, W. W. Norton & Company, 2016. 
 Thomas Jefferson's Education, W. W. Norton & Company, 2019. 
 American Republics: A Continental History of the United States, 1783–1850, W. W. Norton & Company, 2021.

Books as contributor
 (Contributor) "One Nation Divisible,"

References

External links
 "The Pulitzer Guy", Colby College Colby Magazine, Winter 2002
 History Department profile, University of California, Davis
 Taylor on The Civil War of 1812: American Citizens, British Subjects, Irish Rebels, & Indian Allies at the Pritzker Military Museum & Library on May 26, 2011

21st-century American historians
21st-century American male writers
History of the Thirteen Colonies
Historians of the United States
University of California, Davis faculty
University of Virginia faculty
Brandeis University alumni
Living people
1955 births
Writers from Portland, Maine
Colby College alumni
Bancroft Prize winners
Pulitzer Prize for History winners
Historians of Maine
Historians from Maine
Academics from Portland, Maine
Members of the American Philosophical Society
American male non-fiction writers